Elizabeth M. Boyer (November 12, 1913 in Ohio – December 2, 2002) was an American lawyer, feminist and writer.

In 1937, she earned a B.S. in education from Bowling Green State University. In 1947, she received her law degree from Cleveland State University College of Law. In 1950, she earned her Masters of Law degree from Case Western Reserve University School of Law. She was a full professor of business law at Cuyahoga Community College.

In 1968, she founded the Women's Equity Action League (WEAL) as a moderate feminist movement for professional women. It provided dissent against the pro-choice stance of the National Organization for Women (NOW).

Boyer also researched and wrote a number of books about historical women, including 16th-century noblewoman Marguerite de La Rocque, who was marooned on an island in the Gulf of St Lawrence as punishment for an affair.

Boyer headed her own publishing firm Veritie Press and was the author of three books. Boyer was a member of Delta Gamma.

Bibliography

Notes

References 

American feminists
20th-century American lawyers
20th-century American women writers
Bowling Green State University alumni
Cleveland–Marshall College of Law alumni
Case Western Reserve University School of Law alumni
Cuyahoga Community College
1913 births
2002 deaths
20th-century American women lawyers